Nancy Cox may refer to:

 Nancy Cox (virologist) (born 1949), American virologist
 Nancy Cox (TV news anchor) (born 1967), American television journalist and beauty pageant contestant